James Lillywhite's Cricketers' Annual was a cricket annual edited by Charles W Alcock the secretary of Surrey County Cricket Club between 1872 and 1900. It is generally referred to as Red Lillywhite because of colour of the cover. It was first published in 1872. It was published by James Lillywhite, Frowd & Co. and sold for 1s.

From the 1876 edition it included a frontispiece which was an actual photograph stuck into the annual.

The 1883 edition includes a tribute to James Lillywhite senior who was "the brain which devised the conception of the Annual" and who had died in 1882.

From 1886 James Lillywhite's Cricketers' Annual incorporated John Lillywhite's Cricketer's Companion after the latter finished in 1885. It was published until 1900.

See also
 Football Annual (a similar publication for football, also edited by Alcock)

References

External links
 www.lillywhites.org - Lilly Fan Page

Annual magazines published in the United Kingdom
Sports magazines published in the United Kingdom
Cricket books
Defunct cricket magazines
Defunct magazines published in the United Kingdom
Magazines established in 1882
Magazines disestablished in 1900